New Jersey Safe Deposit and Trust Company is located in Camden, Camden County, New Jersey, United States. The building was built in 1886 and was added to the National Register of Historic Places on August 24, 1990.

See also
National Register of Historic Places listings in Camden County, New Jersey

References

Commercial buildings on the National Register of Historic Places in New Jersey
Commercial buildings completed in 1886
Buildings and structures in Camden, New Jersey
National Register of Historic Places in Camden County, New Jersey
New Jersey Register of Historic Places
Bank buildings on the National Register of Historic Places in New Jersey
1886 establishments in New Jersey
Victorian architecture in New Jersey